"Pandemic 2: The Startling" is the eleventh episode in the twelfth season of the American animated television series South Park. The 178th episode of the series overall, it originally aired on Comedy Central in the United States on October 29, 2008.

It is the conclusion to the previous episode, "Pandemic". In the episode, the boys are lost in the Andes where they discover the startling secret behind the attack of the giant guinea pigs. The boys now have the power to rescue their town and the rest of the world from the onslaught, but Michael Chertoff, the Head of Homeland Security, stands firmly in their way. Meanwhile, Randy bravely documents the destruction while trying to save his family.

The episode was written by series co-creator Trey Parker and is rated TV-MA L in the United States.

Plot
The episode opens with a monologue recap by Craig Tucker, who is retelling the events up until now in his journal. Craig is stranded in the Andes Mountains with the four main characters and pilots Captains Gabriel and Taylor at a false rendezvous point.  They look for help in the jungle, but find only a "land of the giant lost world", filled with giant fruits. Taylor and Gabriel are killed by baby Guinea bee larvae, and the boys flee.

After running away, Craig and the boys discover a temple, inside of which are carvings depicting a prophecy that details all of the events of the previous episode. They learn from this that the Peruvian flute bands kept the murderous guinea pigs within the jungle. Craig is featured in the final carving. In spite of the intrigue of the carving, Craig refuses to do any more investigating and begins walking back through the jungle. The other boys follow him, complaining of boredom.

Interspersed throughout this story are various flashes in Colorado with Randy, Sharon and Shelley hiding from giant guinea pig monsters (all of which are portrayed by real live-action guinea pigs wearing costumes), a parody of the movie Cloverfield. They hide at home, in a damaged bus, on the roof of a Best Buy, a grocery store, and an Outback Steakhouse. Randy does not stop filming the entire time, and uses unnecessarily shaky camera work, as well as constant zooms and heavy breathing to convey just how "startled" he is by the whole ordeal. The other townspeople, especially Sharon, begin to grow very annoyed by his obsessive taping of the event. Eventually, Sharon has had enough and angrily demands Randy to stop filming, but he says that the video "will be a very important family relic, years from now"; frustrated, Sharon attacks his camera. Also, the townsfolk discover that the guinea pigs take on various other permutations, including guinea rabbits, guinea bees, guinea bears, guinea mice, guinea rats, and guinea-saurus rexes, all of which supposedly originate from the aforementioned "giant world".

Meanwhile, Homeland Security Michael Chertoff travels to Machu Picchu to finalize his plan for world domination.  He accidentally runs into the boys and orders his guards to kill them, claiming they are a Peruvian flute band (which in the previous episode were all prosecuted and ordered sent to Guantanamo Bay detention camp). Stan insists that they are not, and that the bands are the only forces which could stop the guinea pigs. Michael Chertoff snaps, revealing his plan to take over the world. One of the guards, who has had enough of all this, shoots him in the back, but that does not stop the director, since there was no human blood in him. He then reveals his true form, that of a "guinea pirate" (a live-action guinea pig in a pirate outfit). Craig insists that he wants no part of this; he just wants to go home, and he walks away from the scene. But by doing this he accidentally steps on a stone tile, activating some sort of magical ritual in which "sparks" shoot from his eyes and paralyze the Guinea pirate. While concerned by this, Craig's dry tone does not change as he states flatly, "Okay, now there are sparks shooting out of my eyes..." When it's over, he sighs.

The episode ends with a second monologue by Craig, telling the aftermath of the incident, as a pan flute cover of Gary Numan's "Cars" plays in the background. The U.S. government releases all the pan flute bands, who then drive the guinea pigs back to the jungle. Craig concludes that you never know what life has in store for you, there are some things you can't control, and also that he will never trust anyone who asks him for money again. He is shown shutting his front door on the boys, who have come to his house dressed as a Mariachi band, presumably beginning the cycle over again. It is also revealed at this time that Randy forgot to put a tape in his camera after buying it, therefore making his entire effort to tape the ordeal pointless. Meanwhile, back at the office of Homeland Security, the new Director is informed that the guinea pirate has broken out of jail and has begun to attack the city. The ending sequence shows the escaped giant guinea pirate roaming through the streets of Washington, D.C. in his black-and-white prison uniform.

Production

The monsters and shaky camera style of cinematography are a reference to the 2008 American monster movie Cloverfield. The subplot, in which the giant guinea pigs attack a small town is a parody of Night of the Lepus.  The guinea pig costumes were purchased online. According to the creator commentary, the guinea pigs used in filming refused to move when put into the costumes and it took hours of filming to get one usable shot for the episode.

The Guinny Valley where the guinea pig monsters originate from is a parody of Land of the Giants and Land of the Lost (referenced to in the episode as "Land of the Giants Lost World").

Reception
The episode received mixed reviews. The A.V. Club graded the episode a C−, stating "That was too damn long to tell a story with so little substance and so few real laughs. Kinda like Cloverfield. Maybe that was the point".

Home release
"Pandemic 2: The Startling", along with the thirteen other episodes from South Park'''s twelfth season, were released on a three-disc DVD set and two-disc Blu-ray set in the United States on March 10, 2009. The sets included brief audio commentaries by Parker and Stone for each episode, a collection of deleted scenes, and two special mini-features, The Making of 'Major Boobage and 6 Days to Air''.

References

External links
 "Pandemic 2: The Startling" Full episode at South Park Studios
 

South Park (season 12) episodes
Television episodes set in Peru
South Park episodes in multiple parts